The accession of East Timor to the Association of Southeast Asian Nations is a process that started following the independence of the country in 2002 when its leaders stated that it had made a "strategic decision" to become a member state of Association of Southeast Asian Nations (ASEAN) in the future. The country officially applied for membership in 2011.

Closer ties with ASEAN are supported by all political parties in East Timor. East Timor would have by far the smallest GDP in the ASEAN, less than 15% of the smallest current ASEAN member state Laos. In 2022, the country was admitted "in principle" as the organization's 11th member, with full membership pending.

Accession requirements 
The ASEAN Charter defines the following criteria for membership:

 The state must be geographically located in Southeast Asia.
 The state must be recognized by all ASEAN member states.
 The state must agree to be bound by the ASEAN Charter
 The state must be able and willing to carry out the obligations of membership such as:
 Maintaining embassies in all current member countries of the bloc
 Attending all ministerial meetings and summits
 Acceding to all treaties, declarations and agreements in the bloc

While there are no membership requirements pertaining to a country's level of development, some countries had historically opposed East Timor's accession due to its underdeveloped economy.

By 2015, East Timor had fulfilled three major requirements: the country was located in Southeast Asia, was recognized by all ASEAN member states, and has opened embassies in all ASEAN member countries.

Timeline 

 2002: East Timor secedes from Indonesia and is recognized as an ASEAN observer.
 2005: The country joins the ASEAN Regional Forum. 
 2007: The country accedes to the Treaty of Amity and Cooperation in Southeast Asia.
 2011: East Timor officially applies for membership in ASEAN.
 2019: ASEAN fact-finding mission formed.
 2022: East Timor admitted "in principle"; the country gains observer status in all high-level ASEAN meetings.

History

Early relations 
In 2002, East Timor was recognized as an observer of ASEAN and joined the ASEAN Regional Forum in 2005. In January 2007, the country acceded to the Treaty of Amity and Cooperation in Southeast Asia, pledging to renounce the use of force and binding East Timor to non-interference in the internal affairs of ASEAN member states.

In 2005, East Timor said it wanted to be a member by 2010. In December 2007 President José Ramos-Horta restated that joining was a top priority, and he hoped to join by 2012. In January 2009, Thai Prime Minister Abhisit Vejjajiva said that his country would support East Timor's membership of ASEAN by 2012.

Accession efforts 
East Timor officially applied for membership in ASEAN on 4 March 2011. After elections in 2012, the new government reaffirmed their commitment to joining the association. While Indonesia, which East Timor gained their independence from in 2002, has pushed for them to be granted ASEAN membership, other countries, such as Singapore and Laos, have objected on the grounds that East Timor is not yet developed enough to join. However, after the ASEAN summit in April 2013, Secretary General of ASEAN Lê Lương Minh stated that all member states supported East Timor's admission to the association, although he also said that the country was not yet qualified for membership. Philippine President Benigno Aquino III pledged his country's support to East Timor's ASEAN membership in June 2013. The Philippines has previously supported East Timor's ASEAN membership through official documents in 2002 and 2010.

By September 2013, the ASEAN's Coordinating Council Working Group was still evaluating East Timor's membership application, and Minh said that there was no timeline for when the assessment would be completed. Singapore pledged that it would not block East Timor's membership in the association but did not explicitly support it, stating that plans for economic integration must not be derailed by the country's accession. In November 2013, U Aung Htoo, ASEAN Affairs Department deputy director, said that East Timor would not be ready to join in 2014 since they do not have an embassy in all 10 current ASEAN member states, a necessity for membership.

In 2015, East Timor said it is now ready to join the association at any time, telling via East Timor's ambassador to Malaysia that their country had at least fulfilled two major requirements for ASEAN membership. The Philippines re-echoed its support for East Timor's accession to ASEAN on the same year.

In 2017, the Philippines, a close ally of East Timor, became the ASEAN host for 2017. However, ASEAN bypassed East Timor's membership in 2017, mostly because of its lack of human resources which was pointed out by Singapore. Despite this, it was announced that East Timor Prime Minister Mari Alkatiri will continue East Timor's participation in ASEAN as an observer during the 2017 summit. The Philippines, Indonesia, Thailand, and Cambodia reiterated East Timor's membership application during the summit, but 6 member states led by Singapore did not support the move.

In 2018, East Timor's application for membership was still being studied by the association. Despite Singapore being historically opposed to Timor-Leste's accession to the association due to economic reasons, the country began to openly state that they are welcoming the country's membership application when the Timorese Prime Minister visited the latter.

In 2019, ASEAN formed a fact-finding mission to visit the country in September to determine its readiness in joining the association. In June 2019, several ASEAN ministers reiterated their support for East Timor's membership bid.

In 2021, East Timor voted to abstain in a United Nations resolution which aimed to condemn the military dictatorship in Myanmar which ousted the democratically elected government of Aung San Suu Kyi. The vote was influenced by ASEAN chair Cambodia, who also voted to abstain alongside the ASEAN states of Brunei, Laos, and Thailand, while Indonesia, Malaysia, the Philippines, Singapore, and Vietnam supported the resolution. East Timorese officials later expressed their regret, with Ramos-Horta calling the vote a "vote of shame" and stated that the country may have isolated itself from the other members of the association. 

Following his 2022 reelection, Ramos-Horta reiterated the country's desire to join ASEAN, aiming for a 2023 admission when Indonesia is set to chair the organization. He later criticized the lengthy process of joining the organization, stating that "It seems as if to reach ASEAN, you have to fulfill all the criteria to enter heaven. And then the next step is ASEAN."

Accession process and negotiations 
In November 2022, following the 40th and 41st ASEAN Summit in Phnom Penh, the organization issued statement agreeing "in principle" to East Timor's membership, granting East Timor observer status at high-level meetings and stating that a roadmap to full membership would be submitted in the 2023 summit.

In February 2023, the country made its debut at a foreign ministerial level meeting of ASEAN, appearing at the ASEAN Ministers’ Meeting held in Jakarta.

See also 
 Enlargement of ASEAN
 Accession of Papua New Guinea to ASEAN

References

Further reading

 
 
 

Foreign relations of East Timor
East Timor